The Men's 100m T42 had its Final held on September 14 at 11:00.

Medalists

Results

References
Final

Athletics at the 2008 Summer Paralympics